Ophyx ochroptera is a moth of the family Erebidae first described by Achille Guenée in 1852. It is found in Australia, where it has been recorded from Queensland and New South Wales. The habitat consists of rainforests.

The wingspan is about 50 mm. Adults are brown and yellow.

The larvae feed on Ficus macrophylla.

References

Ophyx
Moths of Australia
Moths described in 1852